Age of Feminine is the first album released by American rapper, Kellee Maize.  It was recorded and released independently.  The leading sound engineer was DJ Huggy, who was involved with the mixing and recording of each track for the album. To date, it has been downloaded over one hundred thousand times.

Track listing

References

2007 albums
Kellee Maize albums
2007 debut albums